Pizzo di Cadrèigh (2,516 m) is a mountain of the Swiss Lepontine Alps, located west of Olivone in the canton of Ticino. It lies south of the Scopi, between the Val di Campo and the Valle Santa Maria.

References

External links
 Pizzo di Cadrèigh on Hikr

Mountains of the Alps
Mountains of Switzerland
Mountains of Ticino
Lepontine Alps